The New Orleans Grand Prix was a men's tennis tournament played in New Orleans, Louisiana from 1978 to 1980.  The event was part of the Grand Prix tennis circuit.  It was played on indoor carpet courts in the Louisiana Superdome.

Past finals

Singles

Doubles

See also
Sports in New Orleans

References

Defunct tennis tournaments in the United States
Carpet court tennis tournaments
Grand Prix
Tennis
Recurring sporting events established in 1978
Recurring events disestablished in 1980
1978 establishments in Louisiana
1980 disestablishments in Louisiana
Grand Prix tennis circuit